555 City Center is a 20-story,   skyscraper in the City Center complex of downtown Oakland, California. The building was completed in 2002, and designed by Korth Sunseri Hagey Architects of San Francisco for Shorenstein Properties.

Tenants
Matson Navigation Company
Ask.com (global HQ)

See also

List of tallest buildings in Oakland, California

References

Office buildings completed in 2002
2002 establishments in California
Skyscraper office buildings in Oakland, California